Diego Gonzalo García Cardozo (born 29 December 1996) is a Uruguayan professional footballer who plays as an attacking midfielder for Emelec, on loan from Estudiantes LP.

Career
García's career began in his homeland with Juventud. He made the breakthrough into senior football in 2015–16, initially as an unused substitute for a Primera División draw away to Sud América on 21 November 2015. His professional debut arrived in the succeeding February, appearing for seventy-one minutes of a win on the road against Liverpool. A total of twenty-seven appearances came for García in three seasons, prior to his departure on loan midway through 2017 to Tacuarembó. Goals against Villa Teresa, Oriental, Cerrito and Central Español occurred in the Segunda División. He went back to Juventud at the end of the year.

Juventud were relegated while García was at Tacuarembó, with the attacking midfielder subsequently netting eight times for Juventud in the second tier as they won promotion back to the Primera División for 2019. Ahead of the aforementioned campaign, in February 2019, García was signed by top-flight club Boston River; though immediately returned to Juventud on loan. Two goals in fifteen games followed in four months. On 15 July 2019, García completed a transfer to Argentine Primera División side Estudiantes. He made his bow in the Copa Argentina on 20 July versus Mitre.

Personal life
In September 2018, García and Juventud publicly apologised to left-back Roger Bastos after the Brazilian was racially abused; after García allegedly called Bastos "a monkey" and offered him a banana, though he claimed his intentions were not racist.

Career statistics
.

References

External links

1996 births
Living people
Uruguayan footballers
Uruguayan expatriate footballers
Association football midfielders
Footballers from Salto, Uruguay
Liverpool F.C. (Montevideo) players
Juventud de Las Piedras players
Tacuarembó F.C. players
Boston River players
Estudiantes de La Plata footballers
Talleres de Córdoba footballers
Club Atlético Patronato footballers
C.S. Emelec footballers
Uruguayan Primera División players
Uruguayan Segunda División players
Argentine Primera División players
Ecuadorian Serie A players
Expatriate footballers in Argentina
Expatriate footballers in Ecuador
Uruguayan expatriate sportspeople in Argentina
Uruguayan expatriate sportspeople in Ecuador